Mustafa Ali Balbay (born August 8, 1960 in Burdur) is a journalist, writer and Turkish MP. As the main political correspondent in Ankara for the left-wing Kemalist daily newspaper Cumhuriyet, he wrote a regular column called Gözlem which he took over from the prominent investigative journalist Ugur Mumcu, who was assassinated in 1993. Balbay was arrested on March 5, 2009 as an Ergenekon suspect in the Odatv case, and in August 2009 he was sentenced to 34 years and eight months.

Journalistic career 
Mustafa Balbay began his journalistic career in 1980 as a student reporter for a local newspaper called Gazete Izmir. The next year, he was hired by the centre-left daily Milliyet for their Izmir office and later he moved to Cumhuriyet'''s office in Izmir as a permanent correspondent. In 1985, he became the chief investigating reporter in Izmir for the same newspaper and in 1989 he moved to their headquarters in Ankara to work as the news director. In 1992, Balbay was appointed Cumhuriyet news director in Istanbul. In 1993, he was appointed as the main political correspondent in Ankara for the left-wing Kemalist daily newspaper Cumhuriyet. Later, he gave some lectures for the Faculty of Journalism of Gazi University. Up to 2009, he had also a political talk show called Ankara Rüzgari (Winds from Ankara), co-chaired by the journalist Emin Çölaşan, on Avrasya TV (ART). After his arrest, he continued writing his regular column for Cumhuriyet.

 Ergenekon case 
Mustafa Balbay is detained as part of the government’s investigation into the alleged Ergenekon plot, that authorities claim was aimed at overthrowing the current Turkish government through a military coup. He was initially detained on July 1, 2008, brought to Istanbul, and questioned about his news coverage and his relations with the military and other Ergenekon suspects. Police searched his house and the Ankara office of Cumhuriyet, confiscating computers and documents. Released four days later, Balbay was detained a second time in March 2009 and placed at Silivri F Type Prison in Istanbul pending trial. He was moved to solitary confinement on February 28, 2011. His first trial appearance took place after nine months in detention. On February 25, 2011, the president of the Court, Köksal Şengün, officially opposed his detention, however, the court decided to keep him in detention with majority votes. From October 2012, he shared a cell with the arrested journalist Tuncay Özkan.

 Legal charges 
 being a member of an armed terrorist organization
 attempting to overthrow the government
 provoking an armed uprising
 unlawfully obtaining, using, and destroying documents concerning government security
 disseminating classified information. 
The evidence against Balbay consisted of documents seized from his property and office, the news stories he produced, wiretapped telephone conversations, and secretly recorded meetings with senior military and government officials. In its indictment, the government claimed that Balbay kept detailed records of his meetings with military and political figures with the intention of provoking a coup against the ruling AKP government.

 Defense position 
Mustafa Balbay has denied the government’s accusations. In columns written from prison and in court hearings, he has repeatedly said that the seized notes and recorded conversations related to his journalistic activities. Regarding the taped conversations, he said that such discussions were theoretical and constituted no criminal intent. Moreover, he added that notes shown as evidence and allegedly written by him have three different versions in the indictment. He also rejected claims that he has relations within the alleged Ergenekon organization. In a letter he sent to a delegation composed of Gazetecilere Özgürlük Platformu'' (Freedom for Journalists Platform), RSF, IFJ, EFJ and IPI he said, "if you try to produce a crime from an archive belonging to a journalist, you can declare everyone as guilty".

On August 5, 2009 Balbay was sentenced to 34 years and eight months in prison. Balbay was released after four years and 277 days of imprisonment in the Sincan Prison in Ankara on December 9, 2013. The Constitutional Court declared his lengthy imprisonment a violation of the law and of his rights as an elected Member of Parliament.

Political career
Despite being imprisoned, Mustafa Balbay was elected a parliamentary deputy on the Republican People's Party (CHP) ticket in Izmir Province in the June 2011 election. On December 10, 2013, he took the oath of office, which is compulsory for deputies before they can begin their duties in the parliament.

Bibliography

References

External links 
https://twitter.com/mustafabalbay

1960 births
Living people
People from Burdur
Contemporary Republican People's Party (Turkey) politicians
Deputies of Izmir
Turkish columnists
Cumhuriyet people
Prisoners and detainees of Turkey
Milliyet people
Turkish male writers
Ege University alumni
People convicted in the Ergenekon trials
Turkish prisoners and detainees
Members of the 24th Parliament of Turkey
Members of the 25th Parliament of Turkey
Members of the 26th Parliament of Turkey
Journalists imprisoned in Turkey